"Kisses Down Low" is a song recorded by American singer-songwriter Kelly Rowland and is the first single from her fourth studio album Talk a Good Game. The song was written by Rowland, Marquel Middlebrooks, Timothy and Theron Thomas and Michael Williams, the latter of whom also produced the song under his production moniker, Mike WiLL Made It. Complimented for its lyrics about oral sex and steamy content, "Kisses Down Low" was released on February 1, 2013, serving as the lead single from Talk a Good Game. The song has been certified gold by the RIAA.

The Colin Tilley-directed music video features colorful scenes, featuring several different pin-up looks and multiple vibrant wigs and costumes. Critics noted similarities between the video for "Kisses Down Low" and "Say My Name" by Rowland's former group Destiny's Child

Background and composition 
Following the chart success of her Lil Wayne-backed single "Motivation" (2011), Rowland started to work on her upcoming fourth studio album. She said, "I'm in the studio. Man, it's been so much fun. I do wish that some of my fans could be in there for that ... [so] I have taped a lot of moments for my fans." She went on to add that the follow-up to her third album, Here I Am, will have a theme: "I made sure that I locked in on a concept and everyone that's come in to work on this album, we've all built around it. It's just building up so beautifully. I'm so proud! So I can't wait till all of my fans hear it." The song was written by Marquel Middlebrooks, Timothy Thomas, Theron Thomas, Kelly Rowland, Michael Williams with production helmed by Williams under his production name Mike WiLL Made It.

Critical reception 
A reviewer from Rap-Up described the song as a "bedroom banger". A writer for UK magazine Fact magazine wrote that "Kisses Down Low" as memorable as 2011 world-beater "'Motivation', [it's] a step-up from previous single, "Ice". Carl Williott of Idolator liked the song describing it as a "sluggishly shimmering track" and along with "Ice" "[it's] shaping up to be quite the steamy affair." Meanwhile, not all reviews for the song were positive, in a review in The Sowetan, an editor said that Rowland's vocals were stronger than what was displayed in "Kisses Down Low". The reviewer said "to be honest, the song, produced by Mike WiLL Made It, doesn't really challenge her vocal abilities, which we believe are a lot stronger, but who said a girl can't play around in the studio every now and then?!"

Chart performance 
In the United States "Kisses Down Low" debuted at number 96 on the Billboard Hot 100 for the issue dated March 10, 2013. On its third week the song peaked at number 72.

Music video

Background 
The music video for "Kisses Down Low" was directed by Colin Tilley. On February 10, 2013, Rowland posted behind-the-scenes video, Rowland spoke about the theme of the video saying, "I’m so excited about this video. The theme is fun and flirty and pinup. The makeup is poppin’, the hair is poppin’, the styling is so cool, but it feels just really flirty. I wanted to bring that out of the song instead of making it as racy." The video premiered on VEVO on March 12, 2013.

Synopsis 
The video concept focuses on a number of vanity shots and costume changes. Various scenes from the video feature Rowland dressed as a pin-up girl, on a floral swing, with a curly blonde wig and hot pants. Another scenes features Rowland dressed in a red wig and retro bikini.

Reception 
Sam Lansky from Idolator, gave the video a mixed review writing, " it's not the most thrilling video we’ve ever seen — all those splashy hues and chic looks don't entirely make up for a feeling that it's all a little insubstantial — but it's certainly not bad to look at." John Boone from E! Online compared the video to a number of other music videos by Rowland's former group Destiny's Child, in particular "Say My Name

Track listings and formats 
Digital download
"Kisses Down Low" – 4:14

Credits and personnel 
Recording

 Vocals Recorded at Triangle Sound, Atlanta, Georgia
Music recorded at Eardrum Studios, Atlanta, Georgia.
Mixed at Larrabee Sound Studios, North Hollywood, California.
Mastered at Sterling Sound, New York City, New York.

Personnel

 Sam Thomas - Recording Engineer

Trehy Harris – assistant mixing engineer.
Jaycen Joshua – mixing engineer.
Beau Vallis – recording engineer.
Marquel "Marz" Middlebrooks – co-producer, songwriter.

Kelly Rowland – songwriter, lead vocals.
Timothy and Theron Thomas (Rock City) – songwriter, additional vocals.
Michael L. Williams (Mike Will Made It) – producer, songwriter.

Charts

Weekly charts

Year-end charts

Certifications

Release history

References

External links 
 

2013 singles
Kelly Rowland songs
Song recordings produced by Mike Will Made It
Music videos directed by Colin Tilley
Songs written by Timothy Thomas
Songs written by Theron Thomas
2013 songs
Republic Records singles
Songs about kissing
Songs written by Mike Will Made It
Songs written by Marquel Middlebrooks
Songs written by Kelly Rowland